The Good Boys is a 1997 Indian Malayalam film, directed by K. P. Sunil and produced by Ali. The film stars Jagathy Sreekumar, Mani C. Kappan, Deepanjali and Harishree Ashokan in the lead roles. The film has musical score by Bappi Lahiri.

Cast
 
Kalabhavan Mani as Gopalakrishnan
Sudheesh as Sudhi
Nadirshah as Unni
Edavela Babu as Suseelan
Deepanjali as Maya/Rangeela/Sameera
Madhu as Prathapa Varma
Jagathy Sreekumar as Vikraman Nair
Janardanan as Mohanachandran
Jose Pellissery as Kuruppu
Harishree Ashokan as Kunjandi
Bindu Panicker as Rajeswari
Zeenath as Gomathi Teacher
Kannur Sreelatha as Wife of Kuruppu
Vani Viswanath as Cameo 
Mani C. Kappan 
C V Dev as Astrologer

Soundtrack
The music was composed by Bappi Lahiri.

References

External links
 

1997 films
1990s Malayalam-language films